Kalikesh Narayan Singh Deo (born 26 May 1974) is an Indian politician who was Member of Parliament in the Lok Sabha from Bolangir and member and leader of the Biju Janata Dal political party.

His father, Ananga Udaya Singh Deo, and his grandfather, Rajendra Narayan Singh Deo, were both politicians. Rajendra Narayan Singh Deo was Chief Minister of Odisha.  He attended the Doon School, Dehradun and graduated in Economics from St. Stephen's College, Delhi University. He represented India in shooting and basketball.

Prior to becoming an MP, Deo was the youngest member of the Odisha Legislative Assembly, to which he was returned in 2004 as a representative of the Saintala constituency.

References

External links
Odisha Tourism
ws.ori.nic.in
kalikesh.com

1974 births
Living people
Lok Sabha members from Odisha
India MPs 2009–2014
India MPs 2014–2019
Biju Janata Dal politicians
Indian sportsperson-politicians
The Doon School alumni
People from Balangir